Kere may refer to:

People
 Diébédo Francis Kéré, architect
 Johnson Kere, Solomon Islands sprinter
 Joy Kere, Solomon Islands diplomat
 Kere Johanson, New Zealand softball player and coach
 Mahamoudou Kéré (born 1982), Burkinabé football player

Places
 Kèrè, Benin
 Kere, India

Other
 Kere language